Maximilian George "Max" Stedman (born 22 March 1996) is a British cyclist, who currently rides for UCI Continental team .

Major results
2016
 7th Velothon Wales
 9th Overall Tour of Bulgaria
2017
 1st  Overall Tour of Quanzhou Bay
1st Stage 2
 9th Beaumont Trophy
2018
 1st  Overall Tour of Quanzhou Bay
1st  Mountains classification
1st Stage 2
2020
 1st  Overall Tour of Antalya

References

External links

1996 births
Living people
British male cyclists
English male cyclists
People from Crowthorne